Cory Levy (born October 10, 1991, in Houston) is the founder of FirstText.com and ZFellows.com. Z Fellows is a fellowship that offers you $10,000 to stop what you're doing for a week to work on a side project alongside mentors ranging from the Founder of Tinder to Netflix.  He formerly co-founded and was the COO of ONE, Inc., creators of the After School App, an anonymous social network for high school students. He is also the founder of Internapalooza, a one-day tech conference for Silicon Valley interns.

At the age of 19, Cory raised $1M in venture capital from SV Angel, True Ventures, Charles River Ventures, General Catalyst, Keith Rabois, Gary Vaynerchuk, Naval Ravikant and Michael Dearing to start ONE, Inc.

Prior to leaving the University of Illinois to launch ONE, Inc., where he was studying computer science, with co-founder Michael Callahan, Cory held internships at TechStars, Union Square Ventures, and Founders Fund. Cory was named to Forbes' 30 Under 30 for Consumer Technology and Dorm Room Founders in 2017. He is also the board member of DoSomething.org

References 

American chief operating officers
University of Illinois alumni
1991 births
Living people